Ljania is a genus of mites belonging to the family Axonopsidae.

The species of this genus are found in Europe and Northern America.

Species:
 Ljania bipapillata Thor, 1898 
 Ljania longissima Schwoerbel, 1962

References

Trombidiformes
Trombidiformes genera